is a match-three puzzle video game released by Sega in 1990. Designed by Jay Geertsen, it was released by Sega for arcades and then ported to several Sega consoles. The game was subsequently ported to home computer platforms, including the Atari ST.

Gameplay
Columns was one of the many tile-matching puzzle games to appear after the great success of Tetris in the late 1980s. The area of play is enclosed within a tall, rectangular playing area. Columns of three different symbols (such as differently-colored jewels) appear, one at a time, at the top of the well and fall to the bottom, landing either on the floor or on top of previously-fallen "columns". While a column is falling, the player can move it left and right, and can also cycle the positions of the symbols within it. After a column lands, if three or more of the same symbols are connected in a horizontal, vertical, or diagonal line, those symbols disappear. The pile of columns then settles under gravity. If this resettlement causes three or more other symbols to align, they too disappear and the cycle repeats. Occasionally, a special column with a multicolor Magic Jewel appears. It destroys all the jewels with the same color as the one underneath it. The columns fall at a faster rate as the player progresses. The goal of the game is to play for as long as possible before the well fills up with jewels, which ends the game. Players can score up to 99,999,999 points.

Some ports of the game offer alternate game modes as well. "Flash columns" involves mining their way through a set number of lines to get to a flashing jewel at the bottom. "Doubles" allows two players work together in the same well. "Time trial" involves racking up as many points as possible within the time limit.

Ports
Sega ported the arcade game to the Mega Drive/Genesis console. This version of the game was nearly identical to the original arcade game.

Columns was the first pack-in game for the Game Gear. This version was slightly different from the Mega Drive/Genesis version and its soundtrack was transposed and rearranged due to the limitations of the handheld's sound chip. While the columns themselves were updated for the Mega Drive/Genesis version, the overall decoration was less like a cartoon in the Game Gear version and instead more artistically designed. Lastly, the Game Gear version had a feature that let the player change the jewels to fruit, squares, dice, or playing card suits (clubs, diamonds, spades, and hearts).

In 1990, Compile and Telenet Japan developed and published an MSX2 version.

On November 7, 2006, Columns was released as part of the game Sega Genesis Collection for the PlayStation 2, and later on another release of the above compilation for PlayStation Portable. On December 4, 2006 the title was released on Nintendo's Virtual Console for 800 Wii Points. It is also included on Sonic's Ultimate Genesis Collection for the PlayStation 3 and Xbox 360. It was included as one of the games in the Sega Genesis Mini. It was also included as one of the games in the 2018 releases of Sega Genesis Classics for Windows, Linux, macOS, Playstation 4, Xbox One, and Nintendo Switch. Most recently the game was ported to iOS by Sega, but the port was subsequently withdrawn by Sega. On December 15, 2022, the game was re-released on the Nintendo Switch Online + Expansion Pack.

Music
Tokuhiko Uwabo composed the music for Columns. The songs "Clotho", "Atropos" and "Lathesis" (sic) are named after the Moirai from Greek mythology, related to the Greek flavor of some of the game's art.

Reception 

In Japan, Game Machine listed Columns on their April 15, 1990 issue as being the eighth most-successful table arcade unit of the month. It went on to be Japan's fourth highest-grossing arcade game of 1990 (below Capcom's Final Fight and Sega's Tetris and Super Monaco GP) and third highest-grossing arcade conversion kit of 1991 (below Capcom's Street Fighter II and Sega's Tetris).

Reviewing the game's appearance in Sega Arcade Classics for the Sega CD, Glenn Rubenstein gave it a B+ rating in Wizard magazine, describing it as "like Tetris but a bit better." Mega placed the game at number 34 in their "Top Mega Drive Games of All Time". In 2017, Gamesradar ranked the game 40th on its "Best Sega Genesis/Mega Drive games of all time."

Legacy
Many sequels and spin-offs were produced: Columns II: The Voyage Through Time, Columns III: Revenge of Columns, Columns '97, Sakura Taisen: Hanagumi Taisen Columns 1 & 2, and many compilations and re-releases (Columns Arcade Collection, Sega Ages Vol. 07: Columns) as well. Because Columns was made by Sega, versions were made available on the Master System, Mega Drive/Genesis, Sega CD, Game Gear, Saturn, and Dreamcast. Additional versions of the game have also been made available on PC-Engine, Game Boy Advance, and PlayStation 2. A Super Famicom version was released in Japan via the Nintendo Power service. The Game Boy Color version was specifically called Columns GB: Osamu Tezuka Characters, where it featured many of his characters such as Kimba and Astroboy, but also featured slightly less known characters such as Unico.

Columns has also been cloned many times across different platforms:

References

External links

Columns for Virtual Console 

1990 video games
Articles contradicting other articles
Atari ST games
Falling block puzzle games
FM Towns games
IOS games
Game Gear games
Game Boy Color games
MSX2 games
NEC PC-8801 games
NEC PC-9801 games
Nintendo Switch Online games
Pack-in video games
PlayStation 3 games
Sega Genesis games
Master System games
Sega video games
Sega Games franchises
Sega CD games
Sega arcade games
Sega Meganet games
X68000 games
Super Nintendo Entertainment System games
Xbox Live Arcade games
TurboGrafx-16 games
Video games developed in the United States
Virtual Console games
Virtual Console games for Nintendo 3DS
Multiplayer and single-player video games